In Honor's Web is a 1919 American silent drama film directed by Paul Scardon, written by Sam Taylor (scenario) and Perry N. Vekroff (story).  The film stars Harry T. Morey, Gladden James, and George Backus.

Cast list

References

American silent feature films
American black-and-white films
Films directed by Paul Scardon
1910s American films